The mintuci (Ainu ミントゥチ; also mintuci kamuy, also transliterated into Japanese as ) is a water sprite or an aquatic supernatural creature, a half-man-half-beast, told in stories of  Ainu mythology and folklore. It is also considered a variant of the kappa and therefore a type of yōkai.

Nomenclature 
The name is mintuci (Ainu: ミントゥチ) according to modern Ainu orthography, but it is also commonly spelled  in folkloric study literature written in Japanese.

Definitions 
The mintuci has been defined as "fabulous animal", purported to be "half human and half animal and to inhabit lakes and rivers" in the Ainu dictionary c. 1900 compiled by British missionary John Batchelor. But he also perceived it as a type of water spirit, and stated it was considered by the Ainu to be a type of "koshimpuk" (normalized spelling: kosimpuk), which is a word glossed as meaning  'fairy' or 'daemon'.

Others characterize it as a yōkai, closely akin to the kappa, but others point out that there are legends peculiar to the Ainu that are attached to the mintuci, not seen in kappa legends.

Etymology 
The Ainu word mintuci is considered to be borrowed from the Japanese word mizuchi (or variants thereof) that are local appellations for the kappa, ultimately deriving from the term mizuchi which signifies a type of dragon.

However, Batchelor has given a strictly Ainu etymology for mintuci, explaining it as a compound of mimi (or mim) meaning 'flesh' and  meaning 'devil'.

Synonyms 
According to some Ainu elders, mintuci was a name that people on the Japanese mainland used to refer to kappa, and the correct Ainu term was  literally denoting a "mountain-side-person". Its bald-headedness and reference to the mountain-side suggests a hypothetical connection to, or conflation with, the generic Japanese mountain deity, the Yama-no-Kami.

The creature is known by the name  or slight variants thereof in the Tokachi and Kurshiro regions. It is said to make an occasional grunting noise like "", according to the folklore of the town of Ikeda in the eastern part of the Tokachi Plain, where the hundoci appears the guise of a diminutive old person of indeterminate gender.

The kappa of the Ainu may otherwise be called "mintoci kamuy, nintoci kamuy, or huntoci kamuy" などとも称されるという。

Folklore  

The mintuci are reputedly of the height and stature of a 3-year old to a 12 or 13 year-old human, and it has a head of hair without a "plate" like the kappa (though having fleshy, bald patches on their heads), and though they may be bald-headed the males and females still can be distinguished, or so it has been told in tale where the mintuci appears in the Ishikari River.

Its skin is purplish or reddish, with sea turtle-like texture, and they have either bird-like feet or four sets of hooves, with one supposed witness discovering sickle-like footprints. There also exists oral tradition that both its arms are attached, so that tugging one arm makes the other become shorter, or pulling  on one arm hard enough will cause both arms to be ripped out; however, this curious anatomical lore may not be original, since it is told of the kappa in some regions of Japan. 

The mintuci are said to hunt people and livestock by dragging them under water, but this prankishness is also a trait frequently ascribed to the kappa, cf. the motif of the kappa komabiki ("the water-imp dragging a horse into the water").
 
People may also become possessed by the mintuci, and women possessed by one may attempt to seduce men. According to a legend circulating in Kushiro, on a foggy nights, a victim may detect what seems to be human presence that has abruptly appeared ahead of him, and trying to engage this entity in conversation will go unanswered; it continues to walk onward until the victim notices the odd bird-like footprints, and just then the mintuci'''s shadow would vanish and come around from behind, dragging the victim into the water.

 Benefactor or menace 

Although the mintuci is generally considered an "evil dispositioned" type of fabulous aquatic creature, reputed to "disembowel and devour human beings when they catch them", there are also benevolent types called pirika mintuci (lit. "good mintuci") which inhabit the mountains according to John Batchelor. 

It is not strictly just the mountain type which assists humans (bringing bounty of the mountain, i.e., luck of hunting), because the aquatic mintuci are also known to help (bestow bounties of the waters, i.e., luck in fishing), and there are also dangerous consequences when the mountain mintuci is crossed, as detailed below:

As the mintuci is a deity which controls the fish, it may bring luck to fishermen, but at a price, because as long as it is present it will be responsible for an increase in deaths by drowning. In an anecdote set in the Ishikari region, the mintuci allowed a bountiful catch of fish, but it was sure to take several lives each year, so that the people begged it to move elsewhere to the town of Shizunai in Hidaka (now incorporated into the town of Shinhidaka, Hokkaido), and as a result, the drownings ceased, but the fish catch plummeted afterwards. In another tale, a mintuci became the adopted husband and came to live with the bride's family in the hamlet of Chikabumi in Asahikawa, and he brought about a rich harvest of fish, but was discovered to be the cause of increased drownings in the rivers, so was expelled, and thereafter it moved to Shibichari River (in town of Shizunai). The prosperity of Asahikawa and Saru River was attributed to mintuci protection.

The mintuci also blesses the hunter, rewarding him with game in plenitude according to folk tradition. According to one piece of lore, the chieftain of the mintuci is called mintuci-tono, and he is a bearer of bow and arrows, known to aid humans in need, or giving the gift of bow and arrows, but in return demands offering of sake or hei type ornaments, and people are obliged to comply. But the ornament in question should not be the inaw usually offered to the gods, but a more simplified version.

The mintuci is thought capable of transforming into a youth and becoming an adopted husband at a home with only daughters, bringing about fortune and luck of the hunt, but once the village incurs his wrath, he will depart, absconding with the community's food spirit, causing famine. There are tales of the mintuci acting as guardians for humans in Asahikawa and Saru River areas. In one tale set in Saru River, a mintuci who helped the chieftain carry his load demanded a banquet afterwards, rewarding his hosts with a  said to be an amulet of protection from night raids. When another village attacked, those who participated in providing hospitality to the spirit were intact, but those who failed to come to the gathering all lost their lives. The motif of the golden tobacco case amulet as a gift also occurs in a variant tale entitled "Kappa no hanashi" where the benefactor is the kappa-deity or nintoci kamuy.

 Origin tale 

According to one origin myth, long ago during the epoch when the god Okikurumi descended on earth and ruled over the Ainu (human) world, there came far from the sea the smallpox divinity known to the Ainu as Patum-kamui, and many succumbed to disease. Okikurmi then created a set of 61 Chishinap-kamui (Ti-sinap-kamuy made by braiding mugworts into a cross shape, breathing life into them to fight the smallpox divinity/demon. All but one of the puppets drowned and  grand general who remained managed to defeat the smallpox demon. The puppets that drowned thereafter became the mintuci kamuy, helping people in case of illness or adversity.

A (less mythologized) and historical folk tradition blames the arrival of the pox to Japanese traders and their merchant ships. A smallpox outbreak killed many Ainu. And this led to the custom of creating the weed dolls for protection from this disease, namely, the Ti-sinap-kamuy was not invented by a god, but by the Ainu people. In fact, the literal meaning of Ti-sinap-kamuy'' is  'god whom we bundled/bound'.}

Explanatory notes

References 
Citations

Bibliography

 

 

 

 

 

 

 

 

Ainu kamuy
Water spirits
Ainu legendary creatures
Yōkai
Sprites (folklore)